Adair Park, formerly named Adair State Park, is located in the city of Stilwell, Oklahoma in Adair County, Oklahoma., adjacent to the Adair County fairgrounds. The   park offers 7 RV campsites and 20 primitive campsites, as well as a fishing pond, playground, comfort station with showers, covered shelters and picnic facilities. Fishing is allowed from the shore of the pond.

The state of Oklahoma announced in 2011 that it would close this park as a budget-cutting measure. Rather than closing, on September 15, 2011, Adair County assumed management of the park. It is now formally known as Adair Park.

References 

Parks in Oklahoma
Protected areas of Adair County, Oklahoma